Brigadier General John Skinner Mallory (1 November 1857 – 2 February 1932) was a United States Army officer who saw active service in numerous conflicts throughout his military career, including World War I. He is also known for writing the Small Arms Firing Manual.

Early years 
Mallory was born near Hampton, Virginia on 1 November 1857, the son of Charles R. Mallory, formerly a colonel in the Confederate Army and Martha Skinner Mallory. He was educated in private schools in Hampton and Norfolk, Mallory went on to attend the U.S. Military Academy, from which he graduated in 1879.

Military career 
Following his graduation in 1879, Mallory was commissioned into the 20th Infantry Regiment, performing frontier duty from 1879 to 1883. Following a period of twenty years of service with the regiment, Mallory was appointed acting chief commissary for General Nelson Miles during the Ghost Dance War from 1890–1891.

In 1893, Mallory authored the Small Arms Firing Manual, which became the official manual for the services, with frequent revisions throughout the following years.

Mallory saw brief service in the Spanish–American War and the ensuing Philippine insurrection. During the Spanish–American War, Mallory was deployed to the Philippines under General Otis in 1898. He remained in the Philippines after the Spanish defeat to take part in the Philippine–American War under General Arthur MacArthur. For his service in the Philippines, Mallory received two Silver Star commendations.

In 1900, Mallory was appointed military attaché in China, the position he would hold until the following year. After returning to the United States, Mallory served with the 1st and 12th Infantry regiments before serving on the War Department General Staff from 1903 to 1906.

In 1909, Mallory was deployed once more to the Philippines, this time with the 11th Regiment until May 1910, when he returned to the U.S. and was stationed at Fort D.A. Russel, Wyoming. The following year, he was appointed inspector-general for the Department of Texas from January to March 1911, after which he attended and graduated from the Army War College. In 1912, he received his promotion to colonel and was given command of the 29th Regiment at Fort Jay, New York. In 1915, Mallory and the 29th was stationed at Camp Gaillard near the Panama Canal, with a brief interlude in 1916 during which Mallory was stationed at Headquarters Eastern Department on Governor's Island, NY.

In August 1917, four months after the American entry into World War I, Mallory took command of the 153rd Depot Brigade at Fort Dix, New Jersey, before assuming command of the 78th Division and the Fort Dix itself until December 1917. In early 1918, Mallory was promoted to brigadier general and given command of the 7th Infantry Brigade, but he failed his physical examination and was relieved before the brigade left for combat in France.

Mallory reverted to the rank of colonel and commanded the 155th Depot Brigade, Camp Lee and Camp Upton before formally retiring on 30 December 1918.

Civilian life 
Following his retirement from the military, Mallory taught Spanish at the Virginia Military Institute for two years. He was an active member of the Robert E. Lee Memorial Episcopal Church, today the Grace Episcopal Church, in Lexington, Virginia.

Personal life and death 
John Skinner Mallory married Sarah Reed in 1886. They had three children: Henry Reed Mallory, Conn Mallory and John Stevenson Mallory, the latter a U.S. Military Academy graduate. Mallory passed away in Lexington, Virginia on 2 February 1932. He is buried at the Saint Johns Church Cemetery, in Hampton, Virginia.

References

Bibliography 
 Cooke, James J. The U.S. Air Service in the Great War, 1917–1919, (Westport, CT: Praeger Publishers, 1996)

External links

1857 births
1932 deaths
Military personnel from Virginia
United States Army generals
People from Hampton, Virginia
United States Army generals of World War I
United States Military Academy alumni
United States Army War College alumni
Recipients of the Silver Star
American military personnel of the Spanish–American War
American military personnel of the Philippine–American War
United States Army Infantry Branch personnel
Burials in Virginia